The 2015 season was Negeri Sembilan's 92th year in their history and 4th season in Malaysia Premier League since it was first introduced in 2004. Also it was the second season in the Malaysia Premier League following relegation on 2013 season. Along with the league, the club also participated in the Malaysia FA Cup and the Malaysia Cup.

Events 
On December 6, 2014, the president of the Negeri Sembilan Football Association announced that the Negeri Sembilan team will be known as Negeri Sembilan Matrix from the 2015 season. This has become the beginning of the process of privatization of the Negeri Sembilan club which will start in 2016.

On 7 February 2015, Negeri Sembilan won by defeating DRB Hicom FC at Hang Jebat Stadium in the Premier League.

On March 6, 2015, Negeri Sembilan Matrix managed by K. Devan became the new leader of the Premier League after winning their third victory beating Kuantan FA 3-1 at Darul Makmur Stadium , Kuantan. This has allowed the club to snatched that status from the previous top of the league, Johor Darul Ta'zim II.

On 26 April 2015, Negeri Sembilan Matrix managed to climb to fifth in league table after defeating Johor Darul Ta'zim II 2-1 at Tuanku Abdul Rahman Stadium, Paroi.

Pulau Pinang came back in the last minutes of the game to draw 2-2 against NS Matrix in the Premier League football match at Tuanku Abdul Rahman Stadium, Paroi on 8 May 2015.

O

On 26 August 2015, the Negeri Sembilan Football Association disbanded the Premier League team NS Matrix, shortly after the team failed to qualify for the Malaysia Cup 2015. Also eliminated is the head coach, K. Devan.

Players 

Source:

Competitions

Malaysia Premier League

League table

Malaysia FA Cup

Round of 32 
The first round commenced on 27, 28 February & 2 March 2015.

Round of 16 

The second round commenced on 17, 18 & 21 March 2015.

Malaysia Cup

Format 
In the competition, the top 10 teams from 2015 Malaysia Super League were joined by the top 4 teams from 2015 Malaysia Premier League. The remaining two teams from 2015 Malaysia Super League and the team who finished 5th and 6th place in the 2015 Malaysia Premier League competed in the playoffs for the remaining 2 spots. The teams were drawn into four groups of four teams.

Play-off

Statistics

References 

Negeri Sembilan FA seasons
Negeri Sembilan